The 1990 National Camogie League is a competition in the women's team field sport of camogie was won by Kilkenny, who defeated Wexford in the final, played at Enniscorthy.

Arrangements
Kilkenny lost to Cork (who scored 4-11 against them) but defeated Dublin in an evening semi-final fixture at Danesboro. The team had put in very little by way of preparation for the final.

The Final
Kilkenny led by 0-5 to 0-3 at half-time in the final and won by just three points. Siobhan Dunne availed of a mistake in the Kilkenny defence to put Wexfrod in front five minutes into the second half, Ann Donwey and Bridie McGarry inspired Kilkenny to hold out for victory despite another Wexford goal in the last minute by Angie Hearne.

Division 2
The Junior National League, known since 2006 as Division Two, was won by Kildare who defeated Kilkenny intermediates in the final. Kildare beat Roscommon and Kilkenny beat Antrim in the semi-final.

Final stages

References

External links
 Camogie Association

National Camogie League
1990